Elmwood Cemetery may refer to:

Elmwood Cemetery (Adams, New York) in Adams, New York
Elmwood Cemetery (Birmingham, Alabama)
Elmwood Cemetery (Charlotte, North Carolina) in Charlotte, North Carolina
Elmwood Cemetery (Columbia, South Carolina), listed on the National Register of Historic Places in Richland County, South Carolina
Elmwood Cemetery (Detroit) 
Elmwood Cemetery (Gooding, Idaho)
Elmwood Cemetery (Holyoke, Massachusetts), in the Elmwood neighborhood of Holyoke, Massachusetts
Elmwood Cemetery (Kansas City, Missouri), listed on the National Register of Historic Places in Jackson County, Missouri
Elmwood Cemetery (Lorain, Ohio) in Lorain, Ohio
Elmwood Cemetery (Memphis, Tennessee), listed on the National Register of Historic Places in Shelby County, Tennessee
Elmwood Cemetery (North Brunswick) in New Jersey
Elmwood Cemetery (Norfolk, Virginia), listed on the National Register of Historic Places
Elmwood Cemetery (River Grove, Illinois) in River Grove, Illinois
Elmwood Cemetery (West Virginia)
Elmwood Cemetery Gates, Sycamore, Illinois, listed on the NRHP in Illinois
Elmwood Cemetery Office and Entrance Bridge, Memphis, Tennessee, listed on the NRHP in Tennessee

See also
Elmwood (disambiguation)
Elmwood Park (disambiguation)